This is a list of Italian football transfers featuring at least one Serie A or Serie B club. The transfer window of Serie A was opened from 1 July 2019 to 2 September 2019, despite some contracts were already signed before the window. Free agent could join any club at any time.

Transfers
Legend
Those clubs in Italic indicate that the player already left the team on loan on this or the previous season or new signing that immediately left the club

February–May

June

July

August

September

Footnotes

References
general

specific

Summer transfers
2019
Italian football transfers